The 1980 Welsh Cup Final was the final of the 93rd season of the main domestic football cup competition in Wales, the Welsh Cup. The final was contested between Newport County and Shrewsbury Town over two legs. Newport County won 5–1 on aggregate, winning both legs.

Route to the final

Newport County
Newport County scores are shown first in every match

Shrewsbury Town
Shrewsbury Town scores are shown first in every match

Matches

First Leg

MATCH RULES
90 minutes.
30 minutes of extra-time if necessary.
Replay if scores still level.
One named substitute.
Maximum of one substitution.

Second Leg

MATCH RULES
90 minutes.
30 minutes of extra-time if necessary.
Replay if scores still level.
One named substitute.
Maximum of one substitution.

References
Welsh Football Data Archive: Welsh Cup Final 1979/80

1980
Welsh Cup
Welsh Cup
Welsh Cup 1980
Welsh Cup 1980